Rodney J. "Rod" Froelich was a North Dakota Democratic-NPL Party member of the North Dakota House of Representatives, representing the 31st district from 1998 until 2010.

External links
North Dakota Legislative Assembly - Representative Rod Froelich official ND Senate website
Project Vote Smart - Representative Rodney J. Froelich (ND) profile
Follow the Money - Rodney J. Froelich
2006 2002 1998 campaign contributions
North Dakota Democratic-NPL Party - Representative Rodney J. Froelich profile

Members of the North Dakota House of Representatives
1949 births
Living people
People from Corson County, South Dakota
People from Sioux County, North Dakota